The Empire State Open was a golf tournament on the PGA Tour from 1950 to 1952. It was played in the Albany, New York area at two different courses. In 1950 and 1951, it was played at the Shaker Ridge Country Club in Loudonville. For its final year, it moved to the Normanside Country Club in Delmar.

In 1950, Skip Alexander won in an 18-hole playoff over Ky Laffoon. In 1951, Buck White won by two strokes over Doug Ford. In 1952, Jim Ferrier won by six strokes over Sam Snead. He shot an 18-under-par, 262 to threaten the PGA Tour record of 259 for a 72-hole tournament.

Winners

References

Former PGA Tour events
Golf in New York (state)
Sports competitions in Albany, New York